Tbilisi State Institute Of Economic Relations (TSIER) is a state educational institution in Georgia.

It is a business college. It is based in the capital city of Tbilisi. It has three campuses throughout the country: two in Tbilisi and one in Rustavi and serves more than 3,000 students. It is considered to be the top business school in Georgia.  TSIER is fully accredited by the Ministry Of Education of Georgia. The school's success is popularly attributed to Dr. Guram Tavartkiladze, who has been its President and Rector since the founding day of March 19, 1992.

History

Due to popular desire of Dr. Guram Tavartkiladze, Georgian government, general public and foreign governments of western countries (primarily Germany and the United States) to establish a business school in Georgia, Tbilisi State Institute of Economic Relations was founded on March 19, 1992 according to the decree of the Ministry of Education of Georgia. Dr. Guram Tavartkiladze was appointed as its Rector and President. Main agenda of the institution was to bring up highly qualified business managers to help Georgia, the newly independent state of the former Soviet Union, to adopt to capitalism and ease transition from  command economy to market economy.

It is now known as Guram Tavartkiladze Tbilisi Teaching University (GTTU).

References 

Universities in Georgia (country)
Education in Tbilisi
Business schools in Georgia (country)
Educational institutions established in 1992
1992 establishments in Georgia (country)